The 1980 Texas–Arlington Mavericks football team was an American football team that represented the University of Texas at Arlington in the Southland Conference during the 1980 NCAA Division I-A football season. In their seventh year under head coach Harold Elliott, the team compiled a 3–8 record.

Schedule

References

Texas–Arlington
Texas–Arlington Mavericks football seasons
Texas–Arlington Mavericks football